Johannes Thomassen Heftye (17 October 1792 – 2 November 1856) was a Norwegian businessperson and politician.

He was the son of merchant Thomas Johannessen Heftye (1767–1827), an immigrant from Switzerland who founded the family company Thos. Joh. Heftye & Søn. He was the father of banker Thomas Johannessen Heftye and grandfather of Thomas Heftye. He was also an older brother of Henrik Heftye and a brother-in-law of ship-owner Mogens Thorsen.

He was elected to the Norwegian Parliament in 1827, representing the constituency of Christiania. He worked as a merchant and consul there. He only served one term.

References

1792 births
1856 deaths
Norwegian businesspeople
Members of the Storting
Politicians from Oslo
Norwegian people of Swiss descent